Rajagopalan is the name of:

Given name 
Rajagopalan Krishnan (1932–2015), Indian doctor
Rajagopalan Parthasarathy (born 1945), Indian mathematician
Rajagopalan Radhakrishnan
Rajagopalan Vasudevan, Indian scientist

Surname 
Ashok Rajagopalan, Indian writer
Bombay Lakshmi Rajagopalan (born 1959), Indian musician
C. R. Rajagopalan, Indian writer and folklore researcher
K. P. Rajagopalan (1902–1944), Indian writer
Krishnamurthy Rajagopalan (born 1967), Indian cricketer
M. Rajagopalan, Indian politician
 Nisha Rajagopalan
P. K. Rajagopalan, Indian scientist
Pattu Rajagopalan, Indian musician
Ranganayaki Rajagopalan (1932–2018), musician